Kadiatu Lethbridge-Stewart is a fictional character from the Virgin New Adventures range of spin-offs based on the BBC science fiction television series Doctor Who. She is a descendant of Brigadier Lethbridge-Stewart.

A character called Kadiatu Lethbridge-Stewart appeared in Ben Aaronovitch's novelisation of Remembrance of the Daleks (but not in the original television serial). That was in fact Kadiatu's great-grandmother, who wrote The Zen Military — A History of UNIT, which, in the fictional world of Doctor Who, was published in 2006.

Kadiatu's first appearance was in Aarononvitch's New Adventure novel Transit. Her adopted father is Brigadier Yembe Lethbridge-Stewart, a commanding officer in the United Nations Third Tactical Response Brigade and the Zen Brigade during the Thousand Day war between Earth and the Ice Warriors. He is descended from Brigadier Lethbridge-Stewart and an African woman, Mariatu, whom the Brigadier had a relationship with whilst serving in Africa. Brigadier Yembe rescued Kadiatu from a research centre in Leipzig when she was three months old, acting on information received from a possible future Doctor. She had been genetically augmented with unknown technology, although some of her augmentations, such as her musculature, have similarities to Time Lord physiology. These augmentations have given her increased intelligence and rapid healing. She has also never had any form of illness or sickness.

Growing up, her adoptive father told her family stories about the Doctor. Whilst she was a student at Lunerversity, Kadiatu discovered from computer records that the stories were true and continued to research the Doctor's activities.

When she encountered the Seventh Doctor and Bernice in the year 2109, she helped them repel an intruder from the Solar Transit System — a mass transit system that linked all the planets of Earth's Solar System. When attacked, Kadiatu discovered that her instinctive response to hostile action is to kill the attacker. The Doctor also realised that she was extremely close to developing the technology to time travel. The Doctor, knowing that he should stop her from discovering this, chose to see what would happen. Kadiatu was asked to become one of his companions, but she refused. She had researched her own time travel technology and used it to explore the universe by herself.

Kadiatu next encountered the Doctor in Kate Orman's Set Piece. When the Doctor, Ace, and Bernice were scattered through time because of time rifts, the Doctor found himself in Paris, 1871. There, he discovered that the rifts were caused by Kadiatu's time travelling equipment. Kadiatu came under the control of an alien spaceship known simply as Ship, which caused her to take the Doctor as a hostage. He, however, was able to shut down Ship's nervous system thus defeating it, and Kadiatu fled through a time rift.

It was later revealed in the novel The Also People, by Ben Aaronovitch, that the Doctor had rescued Kadiatu after her escape from Ship (finding her in a feral state aboard a slave trading ship, having killed all aboard), and had hidden her on the Worldsphere — home to a very powerful race known as the People. To prevent her from doing any damage in her wild state, the Doctor arranged a remote drone aM!xitsa to guard her. The Doctor realized that he now had to make a decision about Kadiatu, but, undecided whether to kill her or save her life, the Doctor made Bernice make the decision. Although realising that she could prevent the death of many of Kadiatu's victims, Benny decided to save her. The Doctor linked the two women through the TARDIS's telepathic circuits, so that Kadiatu gained Benny's strength to live. She then built a new time machine and together with aM!xitsa again left to explore the universe. The Doctor also gave her an injection of Time Lord genes, allowing her to eventually evolve to understand the complexities of time travel.

She appeared at Benny's wedding to Jason Kane (Happy Endings by Paul Cornell), at which she encountered the Brigadier, her ancestor, and briefly at the funeral of Roz Forrester (So Vile a Sin, by Ben Aaronovitch and Kate Orman), where she ordered the Doctor to snap out of his misery. After a brief mention in The Dying Days, Kadiatu didn't appear again until the 2007 Bernice Summerfield audio drama, The Final Amendment.

References
I Who, Lars Pearson

Literary characters introduced in 1992
Doctor Who book characters
Doctor Who audio characters
Bernice Summerfield
Female characters in literature